ELMAH (Error Logging Modules and Handlers) is an open-source debugging tool for ASP.NET web services. When added to a running web application on a machine, exceptions that are thrown trigger event handlers in the ELMAH tool. These event handlers can include logging to various database back-ends, logging which can be viewed from a web portal, and the sending of notification emails, tweets and RSS articles to advise administrators of the problem. ELMAH provides a pluggable implementation of error logging.

References

External links
 
 elmah on NuGet
 ELMAH Tutorial

ASP.NET
Debuggers
Free software